In the analytic theory of continued fractions, Euler's continued fraction formula is an identity connecting a certain very general infinite series with an infinite continued fraction. First published in 1748, it was at first regarded as a simple identity connecting a finite sum with a finite continued fraction in such a way that the extension to the infinite case was immediately apparent. Today it is more fully appreciated as a useful tool in analytic attacks on the general convergence problem for infinite continued fractions with complex elements.

The original formula 
Euler derived the formula as 
connecting a finite sum of products with a finite continued fraction.

The identity is easily established by induction on n, and is therefore applicable in the limit: if the expression on the left is extended to represent a convergent infinite series, the expression on the right can also be extended to represent a convergent infinite continued fraction.

This is written more compactly using generalized continued fraction notation:

Euler's formula 

If ri are complex numbers and x is defined by

then this equality can be proved by induction
.

Here equality is to be understood as equivalence, in the sense that the 'th convergent of each continued fraction is equal to the 'th partial sum of the series shown above. So if the series shown is convergent – or uniformly convergent, when the ri's are functions of some complex variable z – then the continued fractions also converge, or converge uniformly.

Proof by induction
Theorem: Let  be a natural number. For  complex values ,

and for  complex values , 

Proof: We perform a double induction. For , we have 

and 

We have
 where  

But if  implies  implies , contradiction. Hence 

completing that induction.

if , then both sides are zero.

Using 
and applying the induction hypothesis to the values ,

completing the other induction.

As an example, the expression  can be rearranged into a continued fraction.

This can be applied to a sequence of any length, and will therefore also apply in the infinite case.

Examples

The exponential function 
The exponential function ex is an entire function with a power series expansion that converges uniformly on every bounded domain in the complex plane.

The application of Euler's continued fraction formula is straightforward:

Applying an equivalence transformation that consists of clearing the fractions this example is simplified to

and we can be certain that this continued fraction converges uniformly on every bounded domain in the complex plane because it is equivalent to the power series for ex.

The natural logarithm 
The Taylor series for the principal branch of the natural logarithm in the neighborhood of x = 1 is well known:

This series converges when |x| < 1 and can also be expressed as a sum of products:

Applying Euler's continued fraction formula to this expression shows that

and using an equivalence transformation to clear all the fractions results in

This continued fraction converges when |x| < 1 because it is equivalent to the series from which it was derived.

The trigonometric functions

The Taylor series of the sine function converges over the entire complex plane and can be expressed as the sum of products.

Euler's continued fraction formula can then be applied

An equivalence transformation is used to clear the denominators: 

The same argument can be applied to the cosine function:

The inverse trigonometric functions 
The inverse trigonometric functions can be represented as continued fractions.

An equivalence transformation yields

The continued fraction for the inverse tangent is straightforward:

A continued fraction for π 
We can use the previous example involving the inverse tangent to construct a continued fraction representation of π. We note that

And setting x = 1 in the previous result, we obtain immediately

The hyperbolic functions
Recalling the relationship between the hyperbolic functions and the trigonometric functions,

And that   the following continued fractions are easily derived from the ones above:

The inverse hyperbolic functions
The inverse hyperbolic functions are related to the inverse trigonometric functions similar to how the hyperbolic functions are related to the trigonometric functions,

And these continued fractions are easily derived:

See also 
 Gauss's continued fraction
 Engel expansion
 List of topics named after Leonhard Euler

References 

Continued fractions
Leonhard Euler